Los Monegros is a comarca in Aragon, Spain. It is located within the provinces of Zaragoza and Huesca. The area is prone to chronic droughts, and much of the area is a natural region made up of badlands.

Los Monegros borders seven comarcas: Hoya de Huesca to the North; Somontano de Barbastro, Cinca Medio, and Bajo Cinca to the East; Zaragoza to the West; and Ribera Baja del Ebro and Bajo Aragón-Caspe to the South.

General information
The Sierra de Alcubierre mountain chain crosses the comarca from Northwest to Southeast. Its maximum elevation is 822 meters, at the mountain called Oscuro. The climate is semiarid, with scarce rainfall and high temperatures in the autumn. The area has numerous saltwater and freshwater lakes, including the Lake of Sariñena and the Lake of la Playa.

The area's cultural heritage includes several historical monasteries, including the Monasterio de Santa María de Sigena and the Charterhouse of Las Fuentes.

In December 2007, the local government announced that the comarca had been chosen for the site of the Gran Scala, a huge European project to build a "destination city of leisure for all ages." Designed to include numerous theme parks and casinos, the area would become one of the primary entertainment centers of Europe.

Territory and population
{| class="wikitable" align="center" |- bgcolor=silver
! No.
! Municipality
! Area(km2)! % of total!Inhabitants(2006)
! % of total! Altitude(m)
! Town|-
| align="right" |1
| align="left" |Albalatillo
| align="right" | 9.1
| align="right" | 0.3
| align="right" | 255
| align="right" | 1.2
| align="right" | 259
| align="left" |
|-
| align="right" |2
| align="left" |Albero Bajo
| align="right" | 22.2
| align="right" | 0.8
| align="right" | 111
| align="right" | 0.5
| align="right" | 411
| align="left" |
|-
| align="right" |3
| align="left" |Alberuela de Tubo
| align="right" | 20.8
| align="right" | 0.8
| align="right" | 357
| align="right" | 1.7
| align="right" | 350
| align="left" |Sodeto
|-
| align="right" |4
| align="left" |Alcubierre
| align="right" | 115.3
| align="right" | 4.2
| align="right" | 441
| align="right" | 2.1
| align="right" | 466
| align="left" |
|-
| align="right" |5
| align="left" |Almolda (La)
| align="right" | 131.3
| align="right" | 4.7
| align="right" | 638
| align="right" | 3.1
| align="right" | 491
| align="left" |
|-
| align="right" |6
| align="left" |Almuniente
| align="right" | 37.6
| align="right" | 1.4
| align="right" | 559
| align="right" | 2.7
| align="right" | 337
| align="left" | Frula
|-
| align="right" |7
| align="left" |Barbués
| align="right" | 19.6
| align="right" | 0.7
| align="right" | 115
| align="right" | 0.6
| align="right" | 361
| align="left" |
|-
| align="right" |8
| align="left" |Bujaraloz
| align="right" | 120.9
| align="right" | 4.4
| align="right" | 997
| align="right" | 4.8
| align="right" | 327
| align="left" |
|-
| align="right" |9
| align="left" |Capdesaso
| align="right" | 17.7
| align="right" | 0.6
| align="right" | 161
| align="right" | 0.8
| align="right" | 313
| align="left" |
|-
| align="right" |10
| align="left" |Castejón de Monegros
| align="right" | 165.3
| align="right" | 6.0
| align="right" | 655
| align="right" | 3.1
| align="right" | 466
| align="left" |
|-
| align="right" |11
| align="left" |Castelflorite
| align="right" | 34.8
| align="right" | 1.3
| align="right" | 131
| align="right" | 0.6
| align="right" | 310
| align="left" |
|-
| align="right" |12
| align="left" |Farlete
| align="right" | 104.1
| align="right" | 3.8
| align="right" | 447
| align="right" | 2.1
| align="right" | 413
| align="left" |
|-
| align="right" |13
| align="left" |Grañén
| align="right" | 124.0
| align="right" | 4.5
| align="right" | 2.009
| align="right" | 9.6
| align="right" | 332
| align="left" | Callen, Curbe, Fraella, Montesusin
|-
| align="right" |14
| align="left" |Huerto
| align="right" | 86.7
| align="right" | 3.1
| align="right" | 258
| align="right" | 1.2
| align="right" | 370
| align="left" | Usón, Venta de Ballerías
|-
| align="right" |15
| align="left" |Lalueza
| align="right" | 88.2
| align="right" | 3.2
| align="right" | 1.136
| align="right" | 5.4
| align="right" | 285
| align="left" | Marcen, San Lorenzo del Flumen
|-
| align="right" |16
| align="left" |Lanaja
| align="right" | 183.7
| align="right" | 6.6
| align="right" | 1.457
| align="right" | 7.0
| align="right" | 369
| align="left" | Cantalobos, Orillena.
|-
| align="right" |17
| align="left" |Leciñena
| align="right" | 178.6
| align="right" | 6.5
| align="right" | 1.288
| align="right" | 6.2
| align="right" | 415
| align="left" |
|-
| align="right" |18
| align="left" |Monegrillo
| align="right" | 183.2
| align="right" | 6.6
| align="right" | 495
| align="right" | 2.4
| align="right" | 437
| align="left" |
|-
| align="right" |19
| align="left" |Peñalba
| align="right" | 156.7
| align="right" | 5.7
| align="right" | 756
| align="right" | 3.6
| align="right" | 254
| align="left" |
|-
| align="right" |20
| align="left" |Perdiguera
| align="right" | 109.8
| align="right" | 4.0
| align="right" | 621
| align="right" | 3.0
| align="right" | 473
| align="left" |
|-
| align="right" |21
| align="left" |Poleñino
| align="right" | 33.0
| align="right" | 1.2
| align="right" | 247
| align="right" | 1.2
| align="right" | 290
| align="left" |
|-
| align="right" |22
| align="left" |Robres
| align="right" | 64.3
| align="right" | 2.3
| align="right" | 643
| align="right" | 3.1
| align="right" | 400
| align="left" |
|-
| align="right" |23
| align="left" |Sangarrén
| align="right" | 32.2
| align="right" | 1.2
| align="right" | 263
| align="right" | 1.3
| align="right" | 379
| align="left" |
|-
| align="right" |24
| align="left" |Sariñena
| align="right" | 275.6
| align="right" | 10.0
| align="right" | 4.152
| align="right" | 19.9
| align="right" | 281
| align="left" | La Cartuja de Monegros, Lamasadera, Lastanosa, Pallaruelo de Monegros, San Juan del Flumen
|-
| align="right" |25
| align="left" |Sena
| align="right" | 104.7
| align="right" | 3.8
| align="right" | 556
| align="right" | 2.7
| align="right" | 221
| align="left" |
|-
| align="right" |26
| align="left" |Senés de Alcubierre
| align="right" | 20.5
| align="right" | 0.7
| align="right" | 51
| align="right" | 0.2
| align="right" | 390
| align="left" |
|-
| align="right" |27
| align="left" |Tardienta
| align="right" | 90.6
| align="right" | 3.3
| align="right" | 1.035
| align="right" | 5.0
| align="right" | 389
| align="left" |
|-
| align="right" |28
| align="left" |Torralba de Aragón
| align="right" | 40.4
| align="right" | 1.5
| align="right" | 117
| align="right" | 0.6
| align="right" | 380
| align="left" |
|-
| align="right" |29
| align="left" |Torres de Barbués
| align="right" | 13.9
| align="right" | 0.5
| align="right" | 324
| align="right" | 1.6
| align="right" | 345
| align="left" | Valfonda de Santa Ana
|-
| align="right" |30
| align="left" |Valfarta
| align="right" | 33.2
| align="right" | 1.2
| align="right" | 101
| align="right" | 0.5
| align="right" | 372
| align="left" |
|-
| align="right" |31
| align="left" |Villanueva de Sigena
| align="right" | 146.4
| align="right" | 5.3
| align="right" | 520
| align="right" | 2.5
| align="right" | 231
| align="left" |
|-
| align="center" |#
| Los Monegros| align="right" | 2.764.4| align="right" | 100.0| align="right" | 20.896| align="right" | 100.0| align="center" | —'|-
|}

See also
 Gran Scala
 Aragón
 Comarca
 Monegros Desert

References

External links

 Official webpage of the Comarca of Los Monegros 
 Official Map 
 Comarcas of Aragón, Los Monegros 
 Tourism guide for Los Monegros 
 Los Monegros seen by Javier Blasco 
 Salt lakes of Los Monegros 
 Tourist information 
 Todo acerca del proyecto Gran Scala Monegros 
 Los Monegros y Gran Scala''  - Latest news, photos, video, blog about the "Gran Scala" project in Los Monegros
 https://web.archive.org/web/20080514201501/http://www.monegrosfestival.com/

Comarcas of Aragon
Geography of the Province of Huesca
Geography of the Province of Zaragoza
Natural regions of Spain